Giorgios Tsifoutis (born 14 October 1968) is a retired Greek football midfielder.

References

1968 births
Living people
Greek footballers
Greek football managers
Panserraikos F.C. players
Panathinaikos F.C. players
OFI Crete F.C. players
Ethnikos Piraeus F.C. players
Xanthi F.C. players
Panetolikos F.C. players
GAS Ialysos 1948 F.C. players
Levadiakos F.C. players
Kavala F.C. players
Aiolikos F.C. players
Super League Greece players
Association football midfielders
Greece international footballers
Panserraikos F.C. managers
People from Nigrita
Footballers from Central Macedonia